Acropoma argentistigma is a species of ray-finned fish, a lanternbelly from the family Acropomatidae. It is found in the Indian Ocean off the coast of Thailand. This species was formally described in 2002 by Makoto Okamoto and Hitoshi Ida from types collected at Phuket fish market. In 2012 a specimen was taken off the east coast of India in the Bay of Bengal.

References

argentistigma
Taxa named by Makoto Okamoto
Taxa named by Hitoshi Ida
Fish described in 2002